The 1981–82 Nationale A season was the 61st season of the Nationale A, the top level of ice hockey in France. 10 teams participated in the league, and CSG Grenoble won their second league title. Hockey Club de Caen was relegated to the Nationale B.

First round

Final round

Relegation

External links
Season on hockeyarchives.info

Fra
1981 in French sport
1981–82 in French ice hockey
Ligue Magnus seasons